The 1935 Tour de Suisse was the third edition of the Tour de Suisse cycle race and was held from 24 August to 31 August 1935. The race started and finished in Zürich. The race was won by Gaspard Rinaldi.

General classification

References

1935
Tour de Suisse